Associazione Sportiva Orizzonte Catania Waterpolo, also known as Ekipe Orizzonte for sponsorship reasons, is an Italian women's water polo club from Catania.

Founded in 1985, Orizzonte has dominated the Italian championship in the past two decades, winning every edition between 1992 and 2011 except for 2007, and is also the most successful team in the LEN Champions' Cup with eight titles between 1994 and 2008, including three in a row in the mid-2000s. Most recently it was the competition's runner-up in 2011.

Titles
 LEN Women's Champions' Cup
 1994, 1998, 2001, 2002, 2004, 2005, 2006, 2008
 Women's LEN Trophy
 2019
 Women's LEN Super Cup 
 2008, 2019
  Serie A1
 Champions (22): 1991-92, 1992-93, 1993-94, 1994-95, 1995-96, 1996-97, 1997-98, 1998-99, 1999-00, 2000-01, 2001-02, 2002-03, 2003-04, 2004-05, 2005-06, 2007-08, 2008-09, 2009-10, 2010-11, 2018-19, 2020-21, 2021-22
  Coppa Italia
 Winners (4): 2011-12, 2012-13, 2017-2018, 2020-2021

See also
 National titles won by Sicilian teams

References

Water polo clubs in Italy
LEN Women's Champions' Cup clubs
Sport in Catania